Edgar Yves Monnou (born 9 February 1953) is a Beninese politician. He was the foreign minister of Benin from 1995 to 1996.

References

1953 births
Living people
Foreign ministers of Benin
Place of birth missing (living people)
20th-century Beninese politicians